Eain Met Nat Thamee is a 2004 Burmese drama film, directed by Khin Maung Oo and Soe Thein Htut starring Dwe, Htun Eaindra Bo and Eaindra Kyaw Zin.

Cast
Dwe as Di Par
Htun Eaindra Bo as May Khattar
Eaindra Kyaw Zin as Shin Thant Kyi

References

2004 films
2000s Burmese-language films
Burmese drama films
Films shot in Myanmar